Robert Lee Smith (February 28, 1929 – January 5, 2005) was an American football fullback who played two seasons with the Detroit Lions of the National Football League (NFL). He was drafted by the Cleveland Browns in the fourth round of the 1951 NFL Draft. He played college football at Texas A&M University and attended Mirabeau B. Lamar Senior High School in Houston, Texas.

References

External links
Just Sports Stats

1929 births
2005 deaths
Players of American football from Houston
American football fullbacks
Texas A&M Aggies football players
Detroit Lions players